Guno Kwasie (born 13 November 1985) is a Surinamese footballer who currently plays for Walking Bout Company and the Suriname national football team.

International career

Guno Kwasie has been playing for Suriname since 2012. His debut was against French Guiana  in a friendly match on June 9, 2012. Although playing as a left defender he managed to score a goal. The goal he scored was on January 4, 2017 in the 5th place playoff of the 2017 Caribbean Cup qualification. He scored against Trinidad and Tobago, after he shot the ball only to be deflected by a defender and thus going in goal.

International goals
Scores and results list Suriname's goal tally first.

References

External links
Caribbean football database profile 

1985 births
Living people
Surinamese footballers
Suriname international footballers
Association football defenders